O.G. is a 2018 American drama film directed by Madeleine Sackler and written by Stephen Belber. The film stars Jeffrey Wright, William Fichtner, Boyd Holbrook, Mare Winningham, David Patrick Kelly and Yul Vazquez. The film premiered on HBO on February 23, 2019. The film was entirely filmed in Pendleton Correctional Facility, a maximum security (Level 4) prison in Indiana.

Plot 

The film follows the story of a man preparing to reenter civilian life after 26 years in prison. He must choose between his own freedom and the opportunity to protect a younger fellow inmate.

Cast
 Jeffrey Wright as Louis
 William Fichtner as Danvers
 Boyd Holbrook as Pinkins
 Mare Winningham as Janice
 David Patrick Kelly as Larry
 Yul Vazquez as Baxter
 Bahni Turpin as Ludlow
 Ryan Cutrona as Piner
 Ato Essandoh		
 Kevin Jackson as Mo 
 Theothus Carter as Beecher
 Milan Blakely
Many of the prison's inmates and guards were used as actors and extras. Inmates were selected based on behavior; those with disciplinary actions against them were not eligible.

Release
The film premiered at the Tribeca Film Festival on April 20, 2018. On October 12, 2018, HBO acquired distribution rights to the film. The film premiered on HBO on February 23, 2019.

Reception
On Rotten Tomatoes the film has an approval rating of  based on reviews from  critics. On Metacritic the film has a score of 69 out of 100 based on reviews from 8 critics.

Jeffrey Wright was awarded the "Best Actor in a U.S. Narrative Feature Film" at the 2018 Tribeca Film Festival for his role in the film.

Ben Travers at IndieWire gave it a grade B and wrote: "Can be a tad slow, a touch too simple, and even a little distracted from making a larger, more declarative point about modern incarceration. But by carving its own path through Louis...it's nothing short of original." Aryn Braun of The Economist said about the movie, "If Ms Sackler’s goal was to break the stereotypes inherent in the prison-drama genre, she succeeded." The Document Podcast host, Matt Holzman, of KCRW said ""Madeleine wanted to make a movie that basically asks, 'is incarceration the best way to deal with people who commit crimes?" A reviewer for the Chicago Sun Times wrote "Director Madeleine Sackler does a magnificent job of plunging us into this world, in which inmates are almost always seeing things through the bars of their cells, or the tiny windows giving them a glimpse of the sky."

In 2019, the film was listed as one of The Marshall Project's picks for Criminal Justice in Movies, TV, and Podcasts.

In his 2021 book, Empire of Pain: The Secret History of the Sackler Dynasty, Patrick Radden Keefe notes the mysterious source of funding for the project, likely from Madeline Sackler's inheritance from her family, the prime drivers of America's opioid epidemic. The film's star Jeffrey Wright himself expressed concerns. Keefe writes, "Wright had sent Madeleine an email, praising the 'honesty and openness' of the men in her documentary. But there is an 'elephant' in the room, he wrote. 'You've provided a tremendous gift to those men. Something the likes of which they've rarely, if ever been given.' But they know 'nothing of your story,' he pointed out. ' You never spoke to me about any of that. I was aware and only once tried to broach the subject with you. You didn't open up about it. I went on with my work.' Wright wanted to address it now, though. 'Do you think you should take into consideration that this will become part of the dialogue around these films?' he asked." Madeleine did not respond.

See also 
 List of hood films

References

External links 
 https://www.greatcurvefilms.com/

External links
 
 

2018 films
2018 drama films
2010s prison drama films
American prison drama films
Films scored by Nathaniel Méchaly
Films shot in Indiana
HBO Films films
Hood films
American drama television films
2010s English-language films
2010s American films